Dreaming Out Loud is the debut studio album by American rock band OneRepublic. The album was released on November 20, 2007, by Interscope Records. The album was recorded between 2004 and 2007 and it was produced by Greg Wells, with two songs produced by singer Ryan Tedder, and was engineered and mixed by Joe Zook. The album followed two years of massive success on Myspace; the band had appeared in Myspace Music's Top Artists since early 2006, with over 28 million total song plays counted.

The album was released after the success of a remix version of the lead single "Apologize", which was produced by Timbaland. The song reached number one in many countries, while it peaked at number 2 on the Billboard Hot 100 chart. The following single "Stop and Stare" was also a success, while "Say (All I Need)", "Mercy" and "Come Home" were also released as singles.

The album received generally mixed to negative reviews from music critics. Many critics cited U2, Coldplay, The Fray, Muse and Snow Patrol as the band's influences on the album and commended the band for having a "tremendous confidence apparent in the craft of creating pleasing music", but others felt it was an unoriginal album and thought that Tedder continued to make pop rock far better whenever he was writing for groups other than his own, and also noted that it was difficult to distinguish the differences between some tracks and their influences. The album reached top ten in many countries, including the Australian Albums Chart, Canadian Albums Chart, German Albums Chart, UK Albums Chart and others. It debuted at number 14 on the Billboard 200 chart. Dreaming Out Loud has been certified Platinum by the RIAA.

Background 
OneRepublic is a pop rock band formed in Los Angeles in 2002. The band, which was formed in Colorado by Ryan Tedder and high school classmate Zach Filkins, also includes fellow Coloradan, guitarist/keyboardist Drew Brown, drummer Eddie Fisher, and bass/cellist Brent Kutzle. They worked in the studio for two and a half years and recorded their first full-length album. Two months before their album was due to be released (with "Sleep" as their debut single), they were dropped by Columbia Records. The band was beginning to gain prominence on Myspace, becoming the number-one unsigned act on the site. The song "Apologize" was already released on Myspace the same year.

When a remixed version of "Apologize" found its way onto Timbaland's Shock Value in early 2007, and after the song's appearance in a number of American TV dramas, allied with two years of Myspace notoriety, OneRepublic were blessed with a number one hit, even without an accompanying album.

Composition 
Many critics cited U2, Snow Patrol and The Fray as the band's influences on the album. The album starts out with "Say (All I Need)", which according to Blogcritics is "a U2-sounding song", that is full of soaring heartfelt vocals. It begins with a vocal effect, and leads to an overlooking verse on a girl's soul by Ryan Tedder. With chopped-up, choir-like vocals, Tedder launch a rock ballad that's filled with rising crescendos and interesting musical textures. "Mercy" features an upbeat tempo and is full of hope and promise. "Stop and Stare" is a big, muscular rock ballad, which according to Digital Spy is "very much in the Matchbox 20 mould", steered by a vein-poppingly emotional vocal from lead singer Ryan Tedder. "Apologize" has heart-felt lyrics and is heavy on self-imposed melodrama. It has hip-hop beats mingling with a string section cutting Ryan Tedder's bland vocals with a stuttering R&B drum loop. "Goodbye Apathy" has a chorus that was considered "charmingly harmonious", while Tedder's vocals were considered "U2-sounding". "All Fall Down" begins with an acoustic riff followed by strings that follow the riff, while the verses follows the instruments as well.

The seventh track "Tyrant" crank up the rock guitars, letting a little bit of angst bleed through the band's performance. It begins with a fast piano playing. Tedder enters slowly at first, but picks up speed with a drum beat that enters too. In the song, he sings: "Capable of most anything, this crippled bird's gonna sing". "Prodigal" is a pure ballad that uses guitar riffs and keyboards to back dreamy vocals. "Won’t Stop" is almost an alternative country in its sound. It is a ballad compared to Turin Brakes’ classic The Optimist LP, replete with strings, bells, and harmonized vocals. "All We Are" is a ballad backed by keyboards and reminiscent of The Fray in both sound and style. "Someone to Save You" was considered "a big song, with big vocals and big sound, kind of a ballad on steroids." The somber piano ballad "Come Home" offers a political stance on the war and an appeal to bring the troops home. It is a tribute to American soldiers and was written by Tedder about a soldier friend of his who was serving overseas. The last track is a remixed version of "Apologize" produced and featuring Timbaland. The Timbaland remix has his trademark "yeah" grunts in the background and a slight resequencing of the drum patterns.

Critical reception 

Dreaming Out Loud received generally mixed to negative reviews from music critics. Andrew Leahey from AllMusic gave the album 3 out of 5 stars, and noted that "the album still sounded derivative, almost as if it were mimicking the popular trends that Tedder helped create with his production gigs. None of this made Dreaming Out Loud a bad album, particularly, but it did make it an unoriginal one, and Tedder continued to fare better whenever he was writing for groups other than his own." Blogcritics wrote a very positive review, stating that "Dreaming Out Loud is full of hopeful ballads and a couple of rock songs, and reveals OneRepublic's vocal and musical talents."

Evan Sawdey from PopMatters wrote: "Though Greg Wells' high-budget production gives Dreaming Out Loud a professional sheen, the problems start and end with Tedder. His band, his voice, his lyrics—they've all been heard before. What's particularly disappointing is how his songs all just blend together in a strictly melodic sense." Rob Sheffield from Rolling Stone commented: "On the album, OneRepublic get to assert their own identity, which is a drag, since the half-loud guitars and sob-in-the-throat vocals could be absolutely anybody." Nick Levine from Digital Spy called it "a fairly drab, characterless affair." Chris Jones from BBC Music expressed: "It remains an album that will appeal to fans of the OC and those moments when the lovelorn antics of the cast demand some cod-existentialism. It may be pop, but it's a long way from fun.

Singles 
The first single to be lifted from the album was "Apologize", both in its original form and a version remixed by Timbaland. The remix helped propel the song to number two on the Billboard Hot 100 in late 2007. Its 25 weeks in the top 10 were the most there since Santana's "Smooth" featuring Rob Thomas spent 30 in 1999. "Apologize" has also sold more than 3.6 million downloads only in the United States. It was a number-one single on Australia, Austria, Canada, Italy, Netherlands, New Zealand, Sweden and Switzerland. It also charted at number 3 on the UK Singles Chart. The follow-up single "Stop and Stare" was released on March 3, 2008, in the United Kingdom. The song was a success on the charts, where it reached number 12 on the Billboard Hot 100, number 4 on the UK Singles Chart and inside the top-ten in Austria, Sweden, Switzerland.

A third single from the album, "Say (All I Need)" was released on June 27, 2008. The song wasn't as successful as the previous singles, only reaching number 51 on the UK Singles Chart and number 75 on the Canadian Hot 100. In September 2008, the band released their fourth single, "Mercy". The official video for "Mercy" debuted in the UK on August 15, 2008, on the music channel 'Q'. The video is filmed in black and white and features OneRepublic performing the song on a beach.  However, the song didn't chart on the UK Singles Chart. "Come Home", a digital single, was remastered featuring Sara Bareilles and was released on July 14, 2009, in the iTunes stores and debuted on the Billboard Hot 100 at #80.

Media appearances 
"Apologize" was used in the German film Keinohrhasen (2007) and on Cold Case. "Apologize", alongside "Stop and Stare" and "Mercy", were featured on the seventh season of the American television series Smallville. Also "Stop and Stare" was featured on Castle's pilot episode. "Say (All I Need)" was featured on Ghost Whisperer and The Vampire Diaries. "Come Home" was featured on Cold Case and The Vampire Diaries while "Won't Stop" was featured on The Hills. "All We Are" was used in HBO's 2009 promo. The song "Tyrant" was used in 2010 film The Last Song as the movie's opening song and it was included as the leading track in the official movie soundtrack. The song was also used for the LeBron James' return to Cleveland in the TNT intro before the Miami Heat first played the Cleveland Cavaliers on December 2, 2010.

Track listing

Personnel

Musicians
Ryan Tedder –  lead vocals, acoustic guitar, African drum, keyboard, piano, rhythm guitar, tambourine
Drew Brown – acoustic guitar, keyboard, glockenspiel, piano, rhythm guitar, tambourine, backing vocals
Zach Filkins – acoustic guitar, lead guitar, viola, backing vocals
Eddie Fisher – drums, percussion 
Brent Kutzle – bass guitar, cello, backing vocals
Tim Myers – bass

Production

Jeremy Cowart –  photography
Dennis Dennehy – publicity
Craig Durrance – engineer
Monique Ideltt – marketing
Ari Raskin – engineer
Alexis Reese – marketing coordinator 
Eric Spence – A&R
Marcus Spence – A&R
Ryan Tedder – engineer, mixing, producer
Timbaland – producer
Andrew Van Meter – production coordinator
Greg Wells – producer 
Joe Zook – engineer, mixing

Charts

Weekly charts

Year-end charts

Certifications

Release history

References

External links
 Dreaming Out Loud UK Website

2007 debut albums
Interscope Records albums
Interscope Geffen A&M Records albums
Albums produced by Timbaland
Albums produced by Greg Wells
Albums produced by Ryan Tedder
OneRepublic albums